{{DISPLAYTITLE:C12H16N2O3}}
The molecular formula C12H16N2O3 (molar mass: 236.27 g/mol) may refer to:

 Cyclobarbital
 Hexobarbital